The 2011–12 season was Leeds United A.F.C.'s second season back in the second tier of English football which initially saw the club challenging for the play-offs positions but dismal form in spring resulted in a 14th position finish. In other competitions, the squad only saw one round of the FA Cup with defeat at the hands of Arsenal for the second year in a row and reached the 3rd round of the League Cup, losing to rivals Manchester United.

A turbulent February saw Reserve Team Manager Neil Redfearn in charge of the team for four games with Manager Simon Grayson relieved of his duties and replaced by veteran promotion specialist Neil Warnock. Ross McCormack drastically improved his performance from the 2010–11 season by scoring 19 goals – the most in the squad. He narrowly lost out on Player of the Year to Robert Snodgrass who was made Club Captain by Warnock following the sale of influential local skipper Jonny Howson in January. Young Player of the Year went to Tom Lees who led an injection of the youth into the side with Aidan White establishing himself in the starting line-up and debuts being handed to youngsters Zac Thompson, Charlie Taylor and keeper Alex Cairns.

Off the field, the club's directors reported a healthy profit of £3.5m, but found themselves at war with some supporters following the controversial £7m summer renovation of the Elland Road stadium – a summer which saw a contrasting £0.7m spent on players' transfers and £5.2m received in player sales. Chairman Ken Bates also came under scrutiny from fans following the departures of fans' favourite Howson and 2010–11 Player of the Year Max Gradel.

Events
This is a list of the significant events to occur at the club during the 2011–12 season, presented in chronological order (starting from 11 May 2011 and ending on the final day of the club's final match in the 2011–12 season. This list does not include transfers or new contracts, which are listed in the transfers section below, or match results, which are in the matches section.

May

11 May: Chairman, Ken Bates reveals that defender Federico Bessone and striker Mike Grella have been placed on the transfer list

June
30 June: The players return for pre-season training with only one new face, goalkeeper Paul Rachubka

July
11 July: Long serving Club President, George Lascelles, 7th Earl of Harewood KBE passes away at the age of 88. Lord Harewood became President of the club in 1961 and was also President of the FA from 1963 to 1972.
13 July: Patricia Lascelles, Countess of Harewood accepts Chairman, Ken Bates' offer of becoming the new Club Patron after the passing of her husband, Lord Harewood.
16 July: Manager, Simon Grayson bans his players from social networking website Twitter after striker Davide Somma revealed on his Twitter account, against the wishes of the boss, that he would be out injured for "five or six months". At the time of the ban, professionals Adam Clayton, Max Gradel, Mike Grella, Will Hatfield, Ross McCormack, Ramón Núñez, Lloyd Sam, Charlie Taylor, Zac Thompson, Somma and a handful of Academy players had Twitter accounts. Andy O'Brien previously tweeted, but deleted his account after receiving abuse from other users.

October
21 October: It is revealed that a planned statue of former manager Don Revie by Graham Ibbeson, will be located opposite the East Stand of Elland Road.
24 October: The club announce that several new hospitality suites will open for the first time for the home game against Cardiff City on 30 October. The suites form part of the ongoing redevelopment of Elland Road's East Stand.

November
8 November: Leeds receive the Level Playing Field Award following an audit of Elland Road to access its suitability for disabled staff and fans.
19 November: Simon Grayson announces that Andy O'Brien will not play for the club again after revealing that O'Brien refused to play in the match against Burnley
27 November: The club extends its sympathies to the family of former player Gary Speed who died earlier in the day, reportedly after committing suicide. Leeds later announced that a new suite in the East Stand of Elland Road would be named in Speed's honour, while the team wore black armbands and took part in a minute's applause for Speed before the away game against Nottingham Forest on 29 November and the home game against Millwall on 3 December.

February
1 February: Simon Grayson is sacked as manager following the 4–1 home defeat to Birmingham City the previous day. In an official statement, the club's chief executive Shaun Harvey, stated that Leeds made the decision in the belief that "a new managerial team will be able to get more out of the existing squad of players" and ensure a play-off finish. Reserve team manager Neil Redfearn is appointed caretaker manager with immediate effect.
18 February: After nearly three weeks of speculation, Neil Warnock is announced as the new club manager with an 18-month contract. A number of high-profile managers were confirmed to have applied for the post, including Raddy Antic, Phil Brown, Sven-Göran Eriksson and Albert Ferrer. Redfearn and his coaching staff return to their usual jobs at the club.

Players

First team squad information

Appearances (starts and substitute appearances) and goals include those in The Championship (and playoffs), League One (and playoffs), FA Cup, League Cup and Football League Trophy.
1Player first came to the club on loan and was transferred the following year.
2Player made fifty eight appearances (scoring six goals) for the club during his first spell at the club

Squad stats

|-
|colspan="17"|Players who have been available for selection this season, but have now permanently left the club:

Captains

Assists 

Last updated: 28 April 2012
Source: BBC Sport

Disciplinary record

Transfers

In

1Includes an option of the club extending the contract by one year.
2Although the fee was officially 'undisclosed', the Yorkshire Evening Post confirmed that the fee was £200k

Loans In

Loans Out

Out

1Although the fees were officially 'undisclosed', chairman Ken Bates confirmed that the Gradel fee was approximately £1,700,000, Schmeichel fee – £1,000,000 and Howson fee – £2,000,000
2Despite being out of contract, Atletico Madrid were legally obliged to pay his former club an undisclosed fee which was later reported to be £500,000

New Contracts

1The contract includes the option to extend the contract by a further year.

Pre-season

Competitions

Championship

Table

Results summary

Results by round

Championship

FA Cup

League Cup

Awards

Internal Awards

Official Player of the Year Awards

The results of the 2011–12 Leeds United A.F.C. Player of the Year Awards were announced at a dinner on 30 April 2012 at Elland Road.

Player of the Year:  Robert Snodgrass
Young Player of the Year: Tom Lees
Players' Player of the Year: Robert Snodgrass
Goal of the Season: Adam Clayton (vs Leicester City, 6 November)
Fastest Goal of the Season: Adam Clayton (vs Bristol City, 17 September)
Best Contribution to Community: Aidan White
Chairman's Special Award: Neil Redfearn

External Awards

Championship Team of the Week
The following Leeds players have been selected in the official 2011–12 Championship team of the week.

23 August: Darren O'Dea 
19 September: Adam Clayton 
26 September: Ross McCormack 
3 October: Danny Pugh 
17 October: Tom Lees, Ross McCormack 
5 December: Tom Lees, Danny Pugh, Robert Snodgrass 
16 January: Andros Townsend 
6 February: Robert Snodgrass 
20 February: Adam Clayton 
12 March: Andy Lonergan, Darren O'Dea 
26 March: Andy Lonergan 
16 April: Tom Lees

References

External links

Official Website
Sky Sports
Soccerbase
ESPNsoccernet 

Leeds United F.C. seasons
Leeds United
Foot